DXCR (1386 AM) Hope Radio is a radio station owned and operated by Adventist Media. Its studios and transmitter are located at College Heights, Lilingayon Rd., Brgy. Mount Nebo, Valencia, Bukidnon.

In 1998, Hope Radio reduced its broadcast hours due to severe drought, causing a part of normal electrical power to be generated.

References

Radio stations established in 1973
Radio stations in Bukidnon